The Primetime Emmy Award for Outstanding Supporting Actress in a Limited or Anthology Series or Movie is an award presented annually by the Academy of Television Arts & Sciences (ATAS). It is given in honor of an actress who has delivered an outstanding performance in a supporting role on a television limited series or television movie for the primetime network season.

The award was first presented at the 27th Primetime Emmy Awards on May 19, 1975, to Juliet Mills, for her role as Samantha Cody in QB VII. The award ceremony garnered criticism during the 58th Primetime Emmy Awards, when Ellen Burstyn received a nomination for her work in Mrs. Harris (2005), despite having only 14 seconds of screen time and 38 words of dialogue. This resulted in a rule change, requiring nominees submitting for the category to have more than 5% screen-time on their respective projects.

Since its inception, the award has been given to 38 actresses. Regina King, Jane Alexander, Judy Davis, Colleen Dewhurst, and Mare Winningham have each won two awards. Kathy Bates is the most nominated actress in the category, with seven nominations.

Winners and nominations
Listed below are the winners of the award for each year, as well as the other nominees.

1970s

1980s

1990s

2000s

2010s

2020s

Programs with multiple wins

2 wins
 American Crime
 American Horror Story

Programs with multiple nominations

12 nominations
 American Horror Story

5 nominations
 The White Lotus

3 nominations
 American Crime
 Eleanor and Franklin
 Mildred Pierce
 Miss Rose White
 Mrs. America

2 nominations
 American Crime Story
 And the Band Played On
 Backstairs at the White House
 Big Little Lies
 Cat on a Hot Tin Roof
 Dopesick
 Fargo
 Feud
 George Wallace
 Hamilton
 Hysterical Blindness
 Indictment: The McMartin Trial
 Joan of Arc
 Mare of Easttown
 The Mists of Avalon
 Mrs. Harris
 Oldest Living Confederate Widow Tells All
 Playing for Time
 QB VII
 Temple Grandin
 The Thorn Birds
 Warm Springs
 When They See Us
 The Women's Room
 You Don't Know Jack

Performers with multiple wins

2 wins
 Jane Alexander
 Judy Davis
 Colleen Dewhurst
 Regina King (consecutive)
 Mare Winningham

Performers with multiple nominations

7 nominations
 Kathy Bates

6 nominations
 Mare Winningham

5 nominations
 Anne Bancroft
 Judy Davis
 Colleen Dewhurst
 Alfre Woodard

4 nominations
 Sarah Paulson

3 nominations
 Ellen Burstyn
 Stockard Channing
 Ruby Dee
 Patty Duke
 Penny Fuller
 Eileen Heckart
 Regina King
 Piper Laurie
 Cloris Leachman
 Vanessa Redgrave
 Jean Smart
 Cicely Tyson

2 nominations
 Jane Alexander
 Eileen Atkins
 Angela Bassett
 Polly Bergen
 Toni Collette
 Frances Conroy
 Laura Dern
 Olympia Dukakis
 Julie Harris
 Glenne Headly
 Anjelica Huston
 Shirley Knight
 Swoosie Kurtz
 Melissa Leo
 Audra McDonald
 Rosemary Murphy
 Patricia Neal
 Diana Rigg
 Greta Scacchi
 Sissy Spacek
 Maggie Smith

See also
 TCA Award for Individual Achievement in Drama
 Critics' Choice Television Award for Best Supporting Actress in a Movie/Miniseries
 Golden Globe Award for Best Supporting Actress – Series, Miniseries, or Television Film
 Screen Actors Guild Award for Outstanding Performance by a Female Actor in a Miniseries or Television Movie

References

Supporting Actress - Miniseries or Movie
 
Emmy Award